Gardell Dano Christensen (1907, Fremont County, Wyoming – 1991) was an American writer.

Christensen lived in Dubois, Wyoming, with his wife, the author Eugenia Burney.

Bibliography
Colonial Delaware (1974). Nashville, TN: Thomas Nelson. . Co-author Eugenia Burney.
Home Port Revisited: Stories and poems (1970). San Pedro, CA: Double-A Printing Co. ISBN (?). Co-author Marion Reel.
Colonial New York (1969). Camden, NJ: Thomas Nelson.
Buffalo Horse (1961). New York: Thomas Nelson.
The Buffalo Robe (1960). New York: Thomas Nelson.
Buffalo Kill (1959). New York: Thomas Nelson.

Children's books
Mr. Mouse Needs a House (1958). New York: Henry Holt.
Chuck Woodchuck's Secret (1957). New York: Henry Holt.
All on a Mountain Day (1956). New York: Thomas Nelson.  Co-author Aileen Lucia Fisher.
Mr. Hare (1956). New York: Henry Holt.
The Fearless Family (1955). New York: Henry Holt.
Monkeys (1955). New York: Morrow. Co-author Herbert Spencer Zim.
Duff, the Story of a Bear (1950). New York: D. McKay. Co-author William Marshall Rush.

Sources
Wyoming Authors Wiki

1907 births
1991 deaths
American children's writers
People from Dubois, Wyoming
20th-century American male writers